Pazhassi Raja may refer to:
Pazhassi Raja (1964 film)
Kerala Varma Pazhassi Raja (2009 film)